Dzolokpuita is the capital of the Ho West District. It is one of the districts of the Volta Region, Ghana.

References

Populated places in the Volta Region